Jay L. "Biffy" Lee (September 27, 1887 – April 10, 1970) was an American football player and coach. He served as the head football coach at Penn College—now known as William Penn University—in Oskaloosa, Iowa in 1915 and again from 1917 to 1920 and at the University of Buffalo—now known as University at Buffalo—from 1929 to 1930, compiling a career college football record of 17–20–4.

Playing career
In 1910, Lee attended Albion College, where he played football and baseball. In 1911, he was the quarterback at the University of Notre Dame. He was the college roommate of Knute Rockne.

Coaching career 
In 1916, Lee was an assistant football coach at Notre Dame. He served as the head football coach at the University of Buffalo from 1929 to 1930, compiling a record of 8–7.  He was also on the faculty of the University of Buffalo, lecturing in the School of Marketing.

In 1931, he unexpectedly resigned as the head coach of the Buffalo football program to attend to business duties.

Late life and death
Lee work as an executive for the Phoenix Mutual Life Insurance Company for 27 years until his retirement in 1952. He died on April 10, 1970 in Traverse City, Michigan.

Head coaching record

References

1887 births
1970 deaths
American businesspeople in insurance
American football quarterbacks
Albion Britons baseball players
Albion Britons football players
Buffalo Bulls football coaches
Notre Dame Fighting Irish football coaches
Notre Dame Fighting Irish football players
William Penn Statesmen baseball coaches
William Penn Statesmen football coaches
William Penn Statesmen men's basketball coaches
University at Buffalo faculty
People from Tuscola County, Michigan
Coaches of American football from Michigan
Players of American football from Michigan
Baseball coaches from Michigan
Basketball players from Michigan
Basketball coaches from Michigan